Spermine oxidase (PAOh1/SMO, AtPAO1, AtPAO4, SMO) is an enzyme with systematic name spermidine:oxygen oxidoreductase (spermidine-forming). This enzyme catalyses the following chemical reaction

 spermine + O2 + H2O  spermidine + 3-aminopropanal + H2O2

The enzyme from Arabidopsis thaliana oxidizes norspermine to norspermidine.

References

External links 
 

EC 1.5.3